Adam Olearius  (born Adam Ölschläger or Oehlschlaeger,  24 September 159922 February 1671) was a German scholar, mathematician, geographer and librarian. He became secretary to the ambassador sent by Frederick III, Duke of Holstein-Gottorp, to the Shah of Safavid Persia (Iran), and published two books about the events and observations during his travels.

Travels
He was born at Aschersleben, near Magdeburg. After studying at Leipzig he became librarian and court mathematician to Frederick III, and in 1633 he was appointed secretary to the ambassadors Philipp Crusius, jurisconsult, and Otto Bruggemann, a merchant from Hamburg, sent by the duke to Muscovy and Persia in the hope of making arrangements by which his newly founded city of Friedrichstadt should become the terminus of an overland silk-trade. This embassy started from Gottorp on 22 October 1633 and travelled by Hamburg, Lübeck, Riga, Dorpat (five months' stay), Reval, Narva, Ladoga, and Novgorod to Moscow (14 August 1634). Here they concluded an advantageous treaty with Tsar Michael of Russia, and returned forthwith to Gottorp (14 December 16347 April 1635) to procure the ratification of this arrangement from the duke, before proceeding to Persia.

With this accomplished, they started afresh from Hamburg on 22 October 1635, arrived at Moscow on 29 March 1636; and left Moscow on 30 June for Balakhna near Nizhniy Novgorod, to where they had already sent agents (in 1634/1635) to prepare a vessel for their descent of the Volga. Their voyage down the great river and over the Caspian Sea was slow and hindered by accidents, especially by grounding, as near Darband on 14 November 1636; but at last, by way of Shamakhy (three months' delay here), Ardabil, Soltaniyeh and Kasvin, they reached the Persian court at Isfahan (3 August 1637) and were received by the Safavid king, Shah Safi (16 August).

Negotiations here were not as successful as at Moscow, and the embassy left Isfahan on 21 December 1637, and returned home by Rasht, Lenkoran, Astrakhan, Kazan, Moscow, and other places. At Reval, Olearius parted from his colleagues (15 April 1639) and embarked directly for Lübeck. On his way he had made a chart of the Volga, and partly for this reason Michael wished to either persuade or compel him to enter his service. Once back at Gottorp, Olearius became librarian to the duke, who also made him keeper of his cabinet of curiosities, and induced the tsar to excuse his (promised) return to Moscow. Under his care the Gottorp library and cabinet were greatly enriched in manuscripts, books, and oriental and other works of art: in 1651 he purchased, for this purpose, the collection of the Dutch scholar and physician,  (born Berent ten Broecke). He died at Gottorp on 22 February 1671.

Books

It is by his admirable narrative of the Russian and the Persian legation (Beschreibung der muscowitischen und persischen Reise, Schleswig, 1647, and afterwards in several enlarged editions, 1656, etc.) that Olearius is best known, though he also published a history of Holstein (Kurtzer Begriff einer holsteinischen Chronic, Schleswig, 1663), a famous catalogue of the Holstein-Gottorp cabinet (1666), and a translation of the Gulistan (Persianisches Rosenthal, Schleswig, 1654), to which was written by Saadi Shirazi appended a translation of the fables of Luqman. A French version of the Beschreibung was published by Abraham de Wicquefort (Voyages en Moscovie, Tartarie et Perse, par Adam Olearius, Paris, 1656), an English version was made by John Davies of Kidwelly (Travels of the Ambassadors sent by Frederic, Duke of Holstein, to the Great Duke of Muscovy and the King of Persia, London, 1662; and 1669), and a Dutch translation by Dieterius van Wageningen (Beschrijvingh van de nieuwe Parciaensche ofte Orientaelsche Reyse, Utrecht, 1651); an Italian translation of the Russian sections also appeared (Viaggi di Moscovia, Viterbo and Rome, 1658). Paul Fleming the poet and J. A. de Mandelslo, whose travels to the East Indies are usually published with those of Olearius, accompanied the embassy. Under Olearius' direction the celebrated globe of Gottorp and armillary sphere were executed between 1654 and 1664; the globe was given to Peter the Great of Russia in 1713 by Duke Frederick's grandson, Christian Augustus. Olearius' unpublished works include a Lexicon Persicum and several other Persian studies.

By his lively and well-informed writing he introduced Germany (and the rest of Europe) to Persian literature and culture. Montesquieu depended on him for local colour in writing his satiric Lettres Persanes (Persian Letters, 1721), though he used the French translation, Relation de voyage de Moscovie, Tartarie et de Perse. Among his many translations of Persian literature into German are Saadi's Golistan: Persianischer Rosenthal. In welchem viel lustige Historien ... von ... Schich Saadi in Persianischer Sprache beschrieben, printed in Schleswig by Holwein in 1654.

See also 
 Globe of Gottorf

References

Further reading 
 Faramarz Behzad: Adam Olearius Persianischer Rosenthal: Untersuchungen zur Übersetzung von Saadis „Golestan“ im 17. Jahrhundert. Vandenhoeck & Ruprecht, Göttingen 1970
 Elio C. Brancaforte: Visions of Persia : mapping the travels of Adam Olearius. Harvard University Press, Cambridge, Mass. 2003. 
 F. Prinz: Von den Historien fremder Völker: des Adam Olearius Gesandtschaftsreisen durch Russland und Persien". In: Damals. Band 24, 1994, S. 850-866
 Karl Rauch: Seidenstraße über Moskau : die große Reise von Adam Olearius nach Moskau und Isphahan zwischen 1633 und 1639. Pfeiffer, München 1960
 Gerhard Dünnhaupt: "Adam Olearius (1599–1671)", in: Personalbibliographien zu den Drucken des Barock, Bd. 4. Stuttgart: Hiersemann 1991, S. 2979-3004. 
 Ersch-Gruber: Allgemeine Encyclopädie der Wissenschaften und Künste''. Verlag F. A. Brockhaus, Leipzig, 1832, 3. Sektion, 3. Teil, S. 37 (Online)

External links

1603 births
1671 deaths
People from Aschersleben
German diplomats
German librarians
17th-century German mathematicians
German translators
People from the Duchy of Holstein
Leipzig University alumni
Writers about Russia
Historians of Iran
German male non-fiction writers
17th-century translators
Ambassadors to the Tsardom of Russia
Ambassadors to Safavid Iran